The Appleton Log Hall is a historic meeting hall in Appleton, a community in Klickitat County, Washington, United States.

Description and history
Located at 835 Appleton Road the massive one and a half story log and timber frame building was erected in 1912. It was added to the National Register of Historic Places on October 2, 1992.

Photo gallery

References

External links
 
 

Event venues on the National Register of Historic Places in Washington (state)
Buildings and structures completed in 1912
Buildings and structures in Klickitat County, Washington
Event venues in Washington (state)
National Register of Historic Places in Klickitat County, Washington
1912 establishments in Washington (state)
Log buildings and structures on the National Register of Historic Places in Washington (state)